Colin Gordon Calloway (born 1953) is a British-American historian.

Life
He is the John Kimball, Jr. 1943 Professor of History and a professor of Native American Studies at Dartmouth College.

Awards and honors
 2004 Merle Curti Award
 2004 Caughey Western History Association Prize
 2005 Ray Allen Billington Prize
 2014 Honorary Doctorate from University of Lucerne
 2018 2018 National Book Award for Nonfiction shortlist for The Indian World of George Washington

Works
 
 First Peoples: A Documentary Survey of American Indian History (1999)

Editor

Anthologies

References

External links
"American Indians and the French-English War", Forum Network, September 28, 2005

21st-century American historians
21st-century American male writers
1953 births
Living people
American male non-fiction writers